Tomasz Franaszek is a Polish sprint canoer who competed in the late 1980s. He won a bronze medal in the K-4 10000 m event at the 1989 ICF Canoe Sprint World Championships in Plovdiv.

References

Living people
Polish male canoeists
Year of birth missing (living people)
Place of birth missing (living people)
ICF Canoe Sprint World Championships medalists in kayak